Painless Love is a 1918 American silent comedy film featuring Oliver Hardy.

Cast
 Oliver Hardy as Dr. Hurts (credited as Babe Hardy)
 Billy Armstrong as His assistant
 Charles Inslee as The building owner
 Peggy Prevost as Swimming pool manager

Reception
Like many American films of the time, Painless Love was subject to restrictions and cuts by city and state film censorship boards. For example, the Chicago Board of Censors required a cut, in Reel 1, of two scenes of a young woman in a one piece bathing suit playing hide-and-seek with the man, near view of young women at pool, two near views of young woman in bathing suit with apron, Reel 2, first two and last two scenes of young women in one piece bathing suits, two closeups of young woman with low cut gown at table, scene of man throwing coin in trouser front and following vulgar actions, two near views of couple in suggestive dance, and three scenes of "Madam Bevo" in suggestive dance where he wriggles tail of hula costume.

See also
 List of American films of 1918
 Oliver Hardy filmography

References

External links

1918 films
American silent short films
American black-and-white films
1918 comedy films
1918 short films
Silent American comedy films
American comedy short films
1910s American films